The grey bush chat (Saxicola ferreus) is a species of passerine bird in the family Muscicapidae. It is found in the Himalayas, southern China, Taiwan, Nepal and mainland Southeast Asia.

Its natural habitats are subtropical or tropical moist lowland forest and subtropical or tropical moist montane forest.

Gallery

References

External links
Xeno-canto: audio recordings of the grey bush chat

grey bush chat
Birds of China
Birds of Taiwan
Birds of the Himalayas
Birds of Northeast India
Birds of Southeast Asia
grey bush chat
grey bush chat
grey bush chat
Taxonomy articles created by Polbot